Kal-guksu is a Korean noodle dish consisting of handmade, knife-cut wheat flour noodles served in a large bowl with broth and other ingredients. It is traditionally considered a seasonal food, consumed most often in summer. Its name comes from the fact that the noodles are not extruded or spun, but cut.

History 
The record of noodles can be found in documents of the Goryeo era, but the descriptions are vague and the nature of the noodles isn't clear. In the 12th century document Goryeo dogyeong (Hanja: 高麗圖經) it is mentioned that noodles were only eaten on special occasions, as wheat flour was very expensive, being imported from China. A cooking description can be found in a later document, The Best New Cooking Methods of Joseon (Hanja: 朝鮮無雙新式料理製法), written in 1924. In the 1934 book Simple Joseon Cooking, the recipe calls for the noodles to be boiled and rinsed in cold water before adding broth and garnish, a method that differs from the modern version of boiling the noodles together with the broth.

Preparation and serving 
The noodles are made with dough from wheat flour and eggs, and sometimes ground bean powder is added for texture. The dough is let to breathe, then rolled out thinly and cut in long strips. The broth for kalguksu is usually made with dried anchovies, shellfish, and kelp. Sometimes chicken broth would be used. In order to obtain a rich flavor, the ingredients are simmered for many hours. The noodles and various vegetables, most often Korean zucchini, potatoes, and scallions are added and boiled together. Usually seasoned with salt, the noodles are served with garnish of choice.

Varieties 
Jemul kalguksu (제물칼국수): Noodles are put to a boil with other ingredients in broth, instead of being added later. Both the noodles and broth gain a thick texture.
Ssuk kalguksu (쑥칼국수): Mugwort is added to the dough when making the noodles. Usually served in anchovy broth.
Mung bean kalguksu (녹두칼국수): Boiled mung beans are crushed, sieved, and added to the noodle dough.
Hobak Pumpkin kalguksu (호박칼국수): Noodles are cooked with a porridge-like mixture of red beans and rice, and served in a hollowed-out pumpkin. A specialty dish of Chungcheongnam-do.
Perilla seed kalguksu (들깨칼국수): Finely ground perilla seeds are added to the broth. Seasoned with soy sauce and garnished with zucchini and shiitake mushrooms.
Pheasant and buckwheat kalguksu (꿩메밀 칼국수): Broth is made from pheasant, and noodles from buckwheat flour.
Pea kalguksu (완두콩칼국수): Peas are boiled and sieved and added to the broth. Seasoned with minced garlic.
Small octopus kalguksu (밀국낙지칼국수): A small octopus is cooked inside a squash, and later cut to add to the noodles and broth.
Pine mushroom kalguksu (송이버섯칼국수): Pine mushrooms are sliced and added with other vegetables while boiling. A specialty from the Gangneung region.
Snail kalguksu (고둥칼국수): Freshwater snails are boiled and ground into a broth, and noodles are added.
Millet kalguksu (조밥칼국수): A specialty dish from the Andong region, noodles are served with rice made of millet, and ssam. The noodles are made from a mixture of bean powder and flour. The meal is served with a seasoning sauce made from soy sauce, minced garlic, scallions, red chili powder, sesame oil, and sesame salt.
Andong kalguksu (안동칼국수): Specialty of the Andong region. Ground bean powder is added to the flour when making noodles. The broth is usually made from chicken.

Gallery

See also 

 Korean cuisine
 Sujebi
 Makguksu
 Noodle soup

References

External links 
 Chewy Noodle with Meat Stock, Kalguksu at What's On's Homepage
 :zh:刀削面 Chinese Knife-cut noodles

Korean soups and stews
Noodle soups
Summer
Korean noodle dishes